Kane Koteka (born 8 January 1994) is an Australian rugby union player who currently plays for the Western Force in the international Super Rugby competition and the Perth Spirit in the National Rugby Championship. His regular playing position is as a loose forward.

Career

Born and raised in Perth, Koteka made his way up through the ranks in Western Australian rugby representing their Under 20 and Combined States sides before getting his big breakthrough in 2014 when he was a member of the Perth Spirit team which competed in the inaugural National Rugby Championship.   He made 9 appearances and scored 3 tries as the Spirit reached the grand final only to go down 37–26 to Brisbane City.

Super Rugby statistics

References

1994 births
Living people
Australian rugby union players
Rugby union flankers
Western Force players
Perth Spirit players
Sportsmen from Western Australia
Rugby union players from Perth, Western Australia
Kamaishi Seawaves players